Roman Tmetuchl International Airport , also known as Palau International Airport is the main airport of Palau. It is located near the former capital Koror, just north of Ngetkib, Airai on Babeldaob island. The airport is 4 miles (6 km) from Koror and 15 miles (25 km) from Ngerulmud.

Overview

It has one runway designated 9/27 with an asphalt and concrete surface measuring 7,200 by 150 feet (2,194 x 45 m). For the 12-month period ending December 13, 2004, the airport had 1,142 aircraft operations, an average of 95 per month: 78% scheduled commercial, 10% air taxi, 8% general aviation and 4% military.

History 

According to the Official Airline Guide (OAG), the only airline serving the airport in the fall of 1993 was Continental Micronesia (formerly Air Micronesia), a division of Continental Airlines, operating nonstop Boeing 727-200 jet service from Guam, Manila, Taipei and Yap, Caroline Islands.

A resolution adopted by the Senate of Palau in May 2006 renamed Palau International Airport as the Roman Tmetuchl International Airport, in honor of the late local politician and businessman Roman Tmetuchl. It is also known as Babelthuap/Koror Airport or Airai Airport.

Delta Air Lines provided scheduled service to Tokyo-Narita until 2018. Following Delta's withdrawal from the Palau market, Skymark Airlines announced that it would start charter service from Narita to Palau, and upgrade these flights to scheduled service in mid-2019.

Airlines and destinations

Statistics

References

External links

 Palau International Airport
 Palau International Airport photo
 Republic of Palau: Division of Transportation
 
 
 

Airports in Palau
Airai